Entry is a 2013 Malayalam film directed by Rajesh Amanakara and starring Baburaj, Ranjini Haridas, Bhagath Manuel and Sija Rose in the lead roles.

Plot

There are two parallel tracks that run in the film, of which the first involves ACP Shreya and ACP Rishikesh. The couple had been married for long, but at the moment, they are on the brink of a divorce and live separately because of some unknown illogical reasons. The second track has Arjun, a student who loves bike and also repair the same as a mechanic, and Subaida, a girl on whom Arjun bumps his bike into Arjun is stolen bikes in the city for a London-based underworld don Lucifer aka Palli Biju who have a past of selling pirated movies CDs from Tamil Nadu. Palli Biju needed of an amount of 25 lakhs money for going for a dinner in Thames river London. Rishikesh and Shreya must save Arjun and catch Biju.

Cast
 Baburaj as ACP Rishikesh
 Ranjini Haridas as ACP P. Shreya Rishikesh
 Bhagath Manuel as Arjun
 Sija Rose as Subaida, Arjun's love interest
 Ashokan as Thampi, Arjun's mentor
 Jins Baskar as Don Lucifer (palli biju), a london based criminal
 Suresh Krishna as Police Commissioner, senior officer1 of Rishikesh and P. Sherya
 Sandeep Menon as Dennis, Arjun's friend
Mahima as Arjun's friend
 Deepika Mohan as Arjun's mother

Release and reception
The film was one of the most anticipated releases of the month as it would mark the film debut of television anchor Ranjini Haridas. It was released on 4 January 2013. Critical reactions were mostly negative with most of the reviewers panning the film mainly due to poor acting and dialogue delivery by Ranjini. Veeyen of Nowrunning.com rated the film 1/5 and concluded that "Ranjini might be the only reason, why you might have walked into the theatre to see the film, in the first place. And 'Entry' should be a disappointment of gigantic proportions, for her fans and detractors alike."

References

External links

2013 films
2010s Malayalam-language films